Stephanie Taylor may refer to:
 Stephanie Taylor (American artist) (born 1971), works in sculpture, illustration, sound and performance
 Stephanie Taylor (Australian artist) (1899–1974), Australian artist and printmaker
 Stephanie Taylor (activist), political activist and author

See also
 Stafanie Taylor (born 1991), Jamaican cricketer